The Abbey of Monte Oliveto Maggiore is a large Benedictine monastery in the Italian region of Tuscany, 10 km south of Asciano. Its buildings, which are mostly of red brick, are conspicuous against the grey clayey and sandy soil—the Crete senesi which give this area of Tuscany its name.

It is a territorial abbey whose abbot functions as the ordinary of the land within the abbey's possession, even though he is not consecrated as a bishop.

It is the mother-house of the Olivetans and the monastery later took the name of Monte Oliveto Maggiore ("the greater") to distinguish it from successive foundations at Florence, San Gimignano, Naples and elsewhere.

History

It was founded in 1313 by Bernardo Tolomei, a jurist from a prominent aristocratic family of Siena. In 1319 or 1320 it was approved by Bishop Guido Tarlati as Monte Oliveto, with reference to the Mount of Olives and in honour of Christ’s Passion.  The monastery was begun in 1320, the new congregation being approved by Pope Clement VI in 1344.

The abbey was for centuries one of the main land possessors in the Siena region.

On January 18, 1765, the monastery was made the seat of the Territorial Abbacy of Monte Oliveto Maggiore.

Leadership
 Territorial Abbots of Monte Oliveto Maggiore (Latin Church)
 Diego Gualtiero Rosa (2010.10.18 – present)
 Michelangelo Riccardo M. Tiribilli (1992.10.16 – 2010.10.18)
 Maurizio Benvenuto Maria Contorni (1986.11.29 – 1992)
 Divo Angelo Maria Sabatini (1970.12.05 – 1986)
 Pietro Romualdo M. Zilianti (1947.05.10 – 1970)
 Luigi Maria Perego (1928.10.15 – 1946)
 Mauro M. Parodi (1917.09.10 – 1928)
 Ildebrando Polliuti (1899.01.08 – 1917.09.10)

Overview

Interior
The monastery is accessed through a drawbridge which leads to a medieval palace in red brickwork, surmounted by a massive quadrangular tower with barbicans and merlons. This edifice was begun in 1393 as the fortified gate of the complex; it was completed in 1526 and restored in the 19th century. Over the entrance arch is a terracotta depicting Madonna with Child and Two Angels attributed to the Della Robbia family, as well as the St Benedict Blessing nearby.

After the entrance structure is a long alley with cypresses, sided by the botanical garden of the old pharmacy (destroyed in 1896) a cistern from 1533. At the alley's end is the bell tower, in Romanesque-Gothic style, and the apse of the church, which has a Gothic façade.

Chiostro Grande
The Chiostro Grande ("Great Cloister") has a rectangular plan and was realized between 1426 and 1443. On the oldest side it has a two-storey loggia and a pit, dating to 1439. The frescoes of the Life of St. Benedict painted by Luca Signorelli and il Sodoma, located in the cloister lunettes under the vaults, are considered masterworks of the Italian Renaissance.

The frescoes disposition follows St. Gregory's account of Benedict's life. Signorelli's paintings were executed in 1497-98, while Sodoma's were completed after 1505.

The church
The church entrance is preceded, in the Chiostro Grande, by frescoes of Jesus Carrying the Cross, Jesus at the Column  and St. Benedict Giving the Rule to the Founders of Monte Oliveto, all the work of Sodoma. The church's atrium is on the site of a previous church (1319), showing on the walls frescoes with Father Hermits in the Desert and St Benedict's miracle, both by an unknown Sienese artists. In a niche is the "Madonna with Child Enthroned" by Fra Giovanni da Verona.

The church takes the form of Latin cross. It was renovated in the Baroque style in 1772 by Giovanni Antinori. The main attraction is the wooden inlaid choir by Giovanni da Verona, executed in 1503-1505. It is one of the most outstanding examples of tarsia in Europe. The church houses also a canvas by Jacopo Ligozzi (Assumption, 1598), behind the high altar, and a 14th-century polychrome wooden Crucifix, in the Sacrament Chapel. The sacristy has an inlaid ceiling dating to 1417.

Chiostro di Mezzo
Che Chiostro di Mezzo ("Middle Cloister") was built in the 15th century, surrounded by a portico with octagonal pilasters. Artworks include a 15th-century Madonna with Child and Angels and Annunciation by Riccio. Nearby is the entrance to the refectory, decorated by frescoes by Fra Paolo Novelli (1670) and, in the end wall, a canvas of the Last Supper by Lino Dinetto (1948).

Library and Pharmacy
The stairs leading to the first floor are decorated by Sodoma's fresco depicting the Coronation of Mary and one by an unknown artist of the Deposition. Antonio Muller (an artist from Danzig) executed in 1631 a Characters and Events of the Olivetani, while by Giovanni da Verona is a wooden candelabrum (1502). The latter artist was also author of the library, which has a basilica plan with a nave and two aisles divided by columns with Corinthian capitals (1518). Nearby is the Monastic Library, housing some 40,000 volumes and incunabula. From the library is the access to the Pharmacy, housing, in 17th century vases, a collection of medicinal herbs.

Definitorio
The name Definitorio refers to the Capitular Hall (1498), on whose end wall is a fresco of Madonna with Child and Saints by Matteo Ripanda (16th century); the hall houses a small museum of Sacred Arts, with works by Segna di Bonaventura (Madonna with Child), the Master of Monte Oliveto (Maestà), Neroccio di Bartolomeo (St. Bernardino), Vincenzo Tamagni (Madonna with Child) and a fresco portraying St. Sebastian by an artist of the Sienese School.

References

External links
Official website 
The Monte Oliveto Maggiore Museum 
Adrian Fletcher’s Paradoxplace – Monte Oliveto Maggiore Photos and History Page
 GCatholic.org
 Catholic Hierarchy
 Abbey Website

Benedictine monasteries in Italy
Monasteries in Tuscany
Churches in the province of Siena
14th-century Roman Catholic church buildings in Italy
Romanesque architecture in Tuscany
Crete Senesi
Religious organizations established in the 1310s
Renaissance paintings
Roman Catholic dioceses in Italy
Christian monasteries established in the 14th century
Monte Oliveto